Chris Cayzer (born Christopher Ashley Luke Cayzer on 29 December 1986) is a Filipino-Australian soul, R&B and acoustic singer, actor, DJ and VJ. He was also a Top 6 finalist in the Over 25 Category on The X Factor Australia in 2012.

Biography

Family Background
Chris Cayzer was born on 29 December 1986 in Brisbane, Australia to Filipino parents Khristine Araneta and Alexander Cayzer.
His mother is from Zamboanga and his father from Manila. He has an older sister, Patricia.

Early life
During his youth in Australia, Cayzer worked two jobs. He was a clerk at K-Mart, and at the same time held down a job as a post master in Australia's post office. These two jobs prompted him to take a vacation in the Philippines.

He travelled with his father to the country, both to relax and help out in their family business.  While in the Philippines, he got an unexpected break in local show business, both as an actor and recording artist.

After graduating from high school, Cayzer left Australia to continue his tertiary education in the Philippines, as well as pursue his musical career.

Career
In 2006, Star Records decided to create sub-label NuGen Music, which aimed to produce more sophisticated pop music. Cayzer became the first artist record under NuGen Music, releasing his debut album that same year. The first single was I Got You, which according to Cayzer is based on personal experience. He also released a remake of Lisa Loeb’s Stay. Star Records also had him contribute a remake of Neocolours’ Hold On for the Bituing Walang Ningning OST.

In 2007, Cayzer became a host for Myx TV, ABS-CBN Global's cable network for Asian Americans in the United States. He hosted numerous shows, including MYX P.I. and OMG before leaving the network in 2008 to pursue other opportunities, including joining Sunday variety show SOP on GMA Network.

In 2009, Cayzer was cast for prime time series on GMA Network called All My Life, co-starring with Kris Bernal and LJ Reyes. Cayzer's second solo album You're the Only Thing was released under Warner Music Philippines on 29 August 2009. The first single from the album was a self-composed Tagalog song called Loko.

In 2010, Cayzer moved to the TV5 network. He eventually left Philippine showbiz the following year and moved back to his native Australia.

In August 2012, Cayzer appeared in the fourth season of Channel Seven's The X Factor Australia and made it to the Top 24.

Musical Influences
Cayzer names John Mayer and his Room for Squares album as his major musical influence. His other musical influences include Rob Thomas of Matchbox 20, James Taylor and Kenny Rankin. Cayzer's father Reggie was a big fan of jazz artists like George Benson, Lee Ritenour and Kenny Rankin, who also influenced Cayzer's music.

Filmography

Television

Movies

Music videos

Discography

Awards and citations

Notes

References

External links
 

1986 births
Living people
Australian people of Filipino descent
21st-century Filipino male singers
Filipino television personalities
VJs (media personalities)
Filipino people of Basque descent
Araneta family
Musicians from Brisbane
The X Factor (Australian TV series) contestants
Star Magic
ABS-CBN personalities
GMA Network personalities
TV5 (Philippine TV network) personalities